Rijnwaarden was a municipality in the province of Gelderland, in the eastern Netherlands. The Rhine enters the Netherlands at its location. Rijnwaarden was merged into the municipality of Zevenaar on 1 January 2018.

Population centres 
Aerdt
Herwen
Lobith
Pannerden
Spijk
Tolkamer

Topography

Dutch Topographic map of the former municipality of Rijnwaarden, June 2015

References

External links 

 

Zevenaar
Former municipalities of Gelderland
1985 establishments in the Netherlands
States and territories established in 1985
Municipalities of the Netherlands disestablished in 2018